The 1967 Railway Cup Hurling Championship was the 41st staging of the Railway Cup since its establishment by the Gaelic Athletic Association in 1927. The cup began on 26 February 1967 and ended on 17 March 1967.

Munster were the defending champions.

On 17 March 1967, Leinster won the cup following a 2-14 to 3-05 defeat of Munster in the final. This was their 11th Railway Cup title and their first since 1965.

Leinster's Eddie Keher was the top scorer with 4-10.

Results

Semi-finals

Final

Scoring statistics

Top scorers overall

Top scorers in a single game

Bibliography

 Donegan, Des, The Complete Handbook of Gaelic Games (DBA Publications Limited, 2005).

References

Railway Cup Hurling Championship
1967 in hurling